The 2008–09 Libyan Premier League season was the forty-first edition of the competition since its establishment in 1963. Al Ittihad were the defending champions, having won their fourteenth Libyan Premier League title with just one round of matches to spare in the previous season. The campaign began on Friday October 17, 2008, delayed due to Libya's World Cup qualifiers, and, depending on the Libyan Cup, is scheduled to finish on June 26, 2009. A total of 16 teams contested the league, including 13 who competed in the previous season and three promoted from the Libyan Second Division. (see 2007–08 Libyan Second Division)

The first goal of the season was scored by newly promoted Wefaq Sabratha's Stefan de Paul against 2003-04 champions Al Olomby in the thirty-second minute of the game on the opening day of the season on October 17. Atef Hussein of Al Olomby scored the first hat-trick of the season against Al Sweahly on December 16, netting two in the final six minutes to help his side to a 3–3 draw.

The season paused for its usual mid-season break. However, this season's break was extended due to the national team's participation in the 2009 African Championship of Nations, and participation (at club level) in Africa's continental competitions. The season continued on March 13.

Wahda Tripoli were the first club to be relegated following a 4–1 defeat to Ahly Benghazi on May 28, 2009.Wefaq Sabratha's relegation was also confirmed on June 18, 2009 despite defeating Jazeera 4–1, as other results went against them. Jazeera's defeat also meant that they would not be remaining in the division for next season. Aman al Aam were relegated on the final day of the season. Although they defeated Khaleej Sirte 2–0, they needed Hilal Benghazi to lose to Sweahly to stay up on head-to-head record. Hilal secured a 0–0 draw, ensuring their survival by one point.

Ittihad Tripoli won the title on June 19, 2009 after defeating Sweahly 2–1 to gain an unassailable lead over second-placed Ahly Benghazi. This was Ittihad's 5th league title in succession, and their 15th overall.

Promotion and relegation
Teams promoted from 2007–08 Libyan Second Division
 Champions: Hilal
 Promoted:
Sweahly
Aman al Aam
 Play-Offs: Wefaq Sabratha

Teams relegated to Libyan Second Division 2008–09
 Urouba
 Suqoor
 Nojom Ajdabiya

League table

Results

Team summary

1 As the 28 March Stadium was not re-opened until October 22, 2008, Benghazi clubs played at stadia selected by the Libyan Football Federation. Some fixtures were also re-arranged so that these clubs played away from home for rounds 1 & 2.
2 Due to Al Jazeera's ban from their Zuwara Stadium, the club will play their remaining home games at 9 July Stadium for the remainder of the season.
3 Wefaq Sabratha's used the Ajaylat Stadium from rounds 1-8 as their own Sabratha Stadium was undergoing maintenance.

NB: The newly constructed Benina Stadium will be used to host matches held in Benghazi, as the 28 March Stadium is undergoing maintenance. The 28 March Stadium will not be in use for the rest of this season.

Awards
 Best fans : Ittihad Tripoli
 Best foreign player : Samer Saeed of Ahly Tripoli
 Best young player : Abdulaziz Belreesh of Ittihad Tripoli
 Best goalkeeper : Samir Aboud of Ittihad Tripoli
 Best defender : Younes Al Shibani of Ittihad Tripoli
 Best midfielder : Mohamed Esnany of Ittihad Tripoli
 Best striker : Ahmed Zuway of Ittihad Tripoli

Season statistics

Goals
First match of the season: October 17, 2008 - Akhdar vs. Tersanah, 14:00 EET
First goal of the season: Stefan de Paul for Wefaq Sabratha against Olomby, 38 minutes and 46 seconds (October 17, 2008)
Last goal of the season: Adnan Belaid for Ahly Tripoli against Tersanah, 84th minute (June 26, 2009)
Fastest goal of the season: 11 seconds - Ismael Bangoura for Al Sweahly against Al Ahly Tripoli (March 25, 2009)
First own goal of the season: Jasim al Toumi (Wahda) for Nasr, 90+1 minutes and 32 seconds (April 11, 2009)
Goal scored at latest point in a match:  90+6 minutes and 36 seconds - Imad al Traiky for Tersanah against Aman al Aam (December 16, 2008)
Widest winning margin: 8 goals: Shat 1–9 Ahly Tripoli (June 5, 2009)
Most goals in a match: 10 goals: Shat 1–9 Ahly Tripoli (June 5, 2009)
Most goals in one half: 6 goals - Shat 1–9 Ahly Tripoli (June 5, 2009) 0–4 half time, 1–9 final
Most goals scored by one player in a match: 4 goals - Pierre Koulibaly (Ittihad Tripoli) against Wahda Tripoli,     (21 May 2009)
First hat-trick: Atef Hussein for Olomby vs Sweahly (December 17, 2008)
Fastest hat-trick: Pierre Koulibaly (Ittihad Tripoli) against Wahda (May 21, 2009);    (13 minutes and 28 seconds)
Most goals in one half by a single team: 5 goals - Shat vs. Ahly Tripoli (21 May 2009) 0–4 at half time, 1–9 final

Discipline
First sending off of the season: Imaad al Khafi for Tersanah against Akhdar - October 17, 2008 (62nd minute)
Card given at latest point in a game: Mahmoud Makhlouf (red) at 90+8 minutes and 4 seconds for Ittihad against Jazeera (January 16, 2009)
First match referred by a Libyan referee: Akhdar vs. Tersanah (October 17, 2008 -  Mohammed Azzallawi)
First match refereed by a foreign referee: Ahly Tripoli vs. Ahly Benghazi (October 17, 2008 -  Khalil Rouaissi)
Most red cards in a single match: 4: Akhdar 1–0 Khaleej Sirte - 2 for Akhdar (Khalifa al Mear & Marei Al Ramly) and 2 for Khaleej (Mohammad Abu Rqiqa & Mohammad Shleeq) (June 13, 2009)

Other
Longest injury time of season: 15 minutes, 4 seconds - Ahly Tripoli 0–2 Ittihad Tripoli (June 10, 2009)

Top scorers
As of June 26, 2009

1 7 goals for Al Olomby

Stadia

See also
2007–08 Libyan Premier League
2008–09 Libyan Second Division
2007–08 Libyan Second Division

References
N.B : Registration required to access archived articles on kooora.com

1
Libyan Premier League
Libyan Premier League seasons